Delvotest is a broad spectrum microbial inhibition test used in dairy for testing antibiotic residue in milk and milk products. It is used to ensure milk safety and is produced by the global company DSM.

The dairy sector has a responsibility to prevent the presence of antibiotic residues in milk for health reasons, processing and economic reasons and legal responsibility to adhere to the Maximum Residue Levels as defined by law.

Delvotest is a testing method that is used throughout the dairy value chain by laboratories, dairy companies and farmers.

The test is validated by:

 France – CNIEL The French Dairy Industry Organization - Ministere de l’Agriculture, de l’Agroalimentaire et de la Forêt
 NL – Qlip – Dutch Quality and Assurance Organization for the Dairy Industry
 UK - CSL Central Laboratory and Executive Agency, UK Department for Environment Food and Rural Affairs (DEFRA
 Brazil – Agricultural Research Corporation, Ministry of Agriculture, Livestock and Food supply
 Nestle  Research Center - validation of 27 antibiotic residues in raw cow's milk and milk-based products, Lausanne, Switzerland
 Nestlé Factory Laboratory, Shuangcheng, Italy; Centro Referenza Nazionale Qualità Latte Bovino IZSLER, Brescia, Italy (2015)
 Italy – AGRIS Agency for Agriculture Development in Sardegna
 Belgium - ILVO The Institute for Agricultural and Fisheries Research – government affiliated
 Poland - PIWET- The National Veterinary Research Institute, part of ministry of Agriculture

References

Antibiotics
Milk